The 1946 Villanova Wildcats football team was an American football team that represented Villanova University as an independent during the 1946 college football season. In their fourth season under head coach Jordan Olivar, the Wildcats compiled a 6–4 record and outscored opponents by a total of 182 to 142.

Halfback Joseph Rogers led Villanova and ranked 15th nationally with 620 rushing yards and averaged 6.89 yards per carry. 

The team played two home games at Shibe Park in Philadelphia and one at Villanova Stadium in Villanova, Pennsylvania.

Schedule

After the season

The 1947 NFL Draft was held on December 16, 1946. The following Wildcat was selected.

References

Villanova
Villanova Wildcats football seasons
Villanova Wildcats football